Hog's Back Road is a  road in Ottawa, Ontario, Canada. The road connects Meadowlands Drive and Prince of Wales Drive to Riverside Drive and Brookfield Road. The road is used as the boundary line between Mooney's Bay Park and Hog's Back Park. It goes over the dam creating Mooney's Bay and Hog's Back Falls, and continues over the Hog's Back swing bridge over the Rideau Canal, to allow taller boats navigating the canal to pass. The road also runs past the spot where the Rideau Canal separates from the Rideau River.

Major Intersections
Prince of Wales Drive / Meadowlands Drive
Hog's Back Bridge
Colonel By Drive 
Bridge over Rideau River and Hog's Back Falls
Riverside Drive / Brookfield Road (to Airport Parkway)

References

Roads in Ottawa